Rahnema, Rahnama or Rāhnamā may refer to:

 Tafsir Rahnama, contemporary 20 volume exegesis on Qur'an in Persian

People
 Majid Rahnema (1924–2015), Iranian diplomat and politician
 Fereydoun Rahnema (1939–1975), Iranian film director and poet
 Ali Rahnema (born 1952), Iranian economist and historian
 Ali Rahnama (futsal player) (born 1985), Iranian futsal player
 Bahareh Rahnama (born 1973), Iranian actress
 Hossein Rahnama (born 1980), academic entrepreneur and innovator

Places
 Rahnama Mahalleh
 Asadabad-e Rahnama, village in Bayaz Rural District